Hamilton Township is one of twelve townships in Caldwell County, Missouri, and is part of the Kansas City metropolitan area with the USA.  As of the 2000 census, its population was 2,362.

Hamilton Township was established in 1867.

Geography
It contains three cemeteries: Rorhbaugh,  Bowman and Highland.

Transportation
Hamilton Township contains two airports, Cliff Scott Airport and Wardell Schoff Airport.

References

External links
 US-Counties.com
 City-Data.com

Townships in Caldwell County, Missouri
Townships in Missouri
1867 establishments in Missouri